Bratz Super Babyz is a video game based on the Bratz Babyz doll line.

Gameplay

Plot summary
Aliens have landed on Earth at the Stylesville Adventure Planet. One of their alien devices, the Matter Exchanger, falls into the wrong hands and transformed the Babyz into superheroes. With their newfound Super Powers, the Babyz use their abilities to help the citizens of Stylesville and battle the evil invading aliens.

Development 
Ubisoft published Bratz games for the PlayStation and Game Boy Advance in 2003, but MGA terminated the license that year and moved it to THQ. This led to a licensing legal battle that resulted in Ubisoft being awarded a $13.2 million judgment. While various THQ 2005 and 2006 games sold  700,000 copies, none of the company's 2007 games would sell over 100,000 units.

The game is based on a direct-to-DVD movie of the same name.

Reception
The game received negative reviews. IGN gave the game a 4.0/10 calling it "unengaging... shallow and dull". Common Sense Media felt the title gave misleading messages on how young girls should look. Gamezone thought the gameplay was simple enough and wouldn't frustrate the player. Worth Playing thought it didn't hold up as a worthwhile licensed game. While Game Vortex did their Bratz reviews from the point of view of the target player, the reviewer still felt it was an "Insult to intelligence". JeuxVideo felt the player needed to have an understanding of the film it was based on to understand the plot.

References 

Bratz video games
2008 video games
Nintendo DS games
THQ games
Windows games
Video games based on toys
Multiplayer and single-player video games